The 2012 SEABA Under-18 Championship was the qualifying tournament for Southeast Asia Basketball Association at the 2012 FIBA Asia Under-18 Championship. The tournament was held in Singapore from June 26 to June 30. The Philippines successfully defended their title by sweeping all of their assignments to earn right to represent SEABA together with Indonesia and Singapore.

Round robin

Final standings

Awards

References

SEABA Under-18 Championship
International basketball competitions hosted by Singapore
2011–12 in Asian basketball
2011–12 in Philippine basketball
2011–12 in Malaysian basketball
2011–12 in Indonesian basketball
2011–12 in Singaporean basketball
2012 in Laotian sport